Afzaal Saeed (born 27 October 1951) is a Pakistani former cricketer. He played six first-class matches for Pakistan National Shipping Corporation cricket team in 1986/87.

See also
 List of Pakistan National Shipping Corporation cricketers

References

External links
 

1951 births
Living people
Pakistani cricketers
Pakistan National Shipping Corporation cricketers
Cricketers from Lahore